El Cartel de los Sapos (English title: The Cartel of Snitches) or El Cartel is a Colombian television series that first aired on June 4, 2008 on the Colombian network Caracol TV. El Cartel stars Manolo Cardona, Karen Martínez, Diego Cadavid, and Robinson Díaz and is based on the 2008 novel by the same name by Andrés López López, alias Florecita ("Little Flower"), a former drug dealer who, while in prison, wrote the fictionalized account of his experiences in the Cali Cartel and of what happened within the Norte del Valle Cartel. In the TV series, which Lopez also wrote, the characters and locations from the book were changed.

Synopsis
Two friends enter the illegal drugs business, thinking it is the fastest way to become rich. The illegal drug trafficking world seems attractive to all these middle-class people, who overlook the associated dangers and legal problems.

This choice begins a turbulent and troubled lifestyle that will change their fates forever. Martín, alias "Fresita",  gets a job in a drugs lab sponsored by the big boss Óscar Cadena (Fernando Solorzano). Martín learns the business quickly and starts to send illegal drugs to the United States, while his boss makes an alliance with the Villegas Brothers, from the West Cartel, to take down the biggest drug dealer ever: Pablo Escobar.

With Escobar down, a new cartel is up: The Pacific Cartel in Colombia, led by Óscar Cadena, so Óscar (the teacher) and Martín (the student) make a pact of friendship and business.

Martín becomes a rich man and he falls for Sofía (Karen Martinez), a beautiful woman, but he wins her heart by lying to her. But Sofía discovers the origin of Martín's wealth, and he has to choose: Sofía or the business.

Óscar helps the police finish the West Cartel. The snitches (sapos) make war between these criminal machines to the point of breaking.

Oscar has been killed and decided to make Martin as the owner of the cartel.
Martín refuses to take part in this war and decides to go to Miami with Sofía and his children, unaware that Miami is no longer a safe place. He continues his illegal activities, meanwhile watching enemies kill his old friends.

As increasing numbers of his business partners and brothers die or get caught, Martin is forced to run to Mexico, looking for protection. He realizes too late that, in this business, you can never win. So he becomes a sapo and tells his tale to the DEA.

In the second season, Pepe, after being captured by the FBI, and now released to be a snitch, tells the rest of the story, which leads to the arrests and deaths of several drug traffickers.

Characters 
Caracol decided to change the characters' real names, their aliases, and some locations from the book, although the filmmakers maintained some physical resemblance between the real-life characters and their portrayers. The following tables detail the names of the characters, their portrayers, and the real life people they represent in the series. The first table also highlights the  first season characters who also appear in the second season.

Associated media
The book upon which the TV series is based also inspired the film El Cartel de los Sapos (2011). Lopez has also written several additional books based on his and his associates' experiences in the drug trade.

Prequel 
A prequel series; The Snitch Cartel: Origins was released by Caracol Televisión in 2021.

References

External links
 Official website
 Telemundo El Cartel Website

2008 Colombian television series debuts
2008 Colombian television series endings
Colombian telenovelas
Colombian crime television series
Spanish-language television shows
Caracol Televisión original programming
Television shows set in Bogotá
Television shows set in Cartagena, Colombia
Television shows set in Miami
Television shows set in New York City
Television shows set in Mexico City
Television shows set in Cancún
Television shows set in Venezuela
Television shows set in Ecuador
Works about Colombian drug cartels
Works about Mexican drug cartels